Curtis Glenn Ford (born October 11, 1960), is an American former professional baseball outfielder, who played in Major League Baseball (MLB) for the St. Louis Cardinals and Philadelphia Phillies, from  through .

Career
Ford attended Murrah High School then Jackson State University and played college baseball for the Jackson State Tigers. The St. Louis Cardinals selected Ford in the fourth round of the 1981 Major League Baseball (MLB) Draft. He made his MLB debut with the Cardinals on June 22, 1985. He batted .308 in the 1987 World Series for the Cardinals versus the Minnesota Twins. After the 1988 season, the Cardinals traded Ford and Steve Lake to the Philadelphia Phillies for Milt Thompson. In his MLB career, Ford had seven home runs, 89 runs batted in, and a batting average of .245.

On May 12, 2010, Ford was announced as the new manager of the Springfield Sliders, a wood-bat collegiate baseball team in the Prospect League. The team plays at Lanphier Park in Springfield, Illinois. Ford took over duties from former manager Jack Clark.

Personal life
On March 25, 2015, Ford was punched at a St. Louis gas station by an attacker shouting racial slurs.  The following day he said he may move away from the St. Louis area.

References

External links

1960 births
Living people
African-American baseball players
Algodoneros de Unión Laguna players
Amarillo Dillas players
American expatriate baseball players in Mexico
Baseball players from Jackson, Mississippi
Baseball players from St. Louis
Charlotte Knights players
Corpus Christi Barracudas players
Diablos Rojos del México players
Jackson State Tigers baseball players
Jackson State University alumni
Johnson City Cardinals players
Louisville Redbirds players
Major League Baseball outfielders
Major League Baseball second basemen
Major League Baseball replacement players
Philadelphia Phillies players
Rochester Aces players
Saskatoon Smokin' Guns players
Scranton/Wilkes-Barre Red Barons players
Springfield Cardinals players
St. Louis Cardinals players
St. Petersburg Cardinals players
Toledo Mud Hens players
21st-century African-American people
20th-century African-American sportspeople